A list of films produced by the Bollywood film industry based in Mumbai in 2003.

Highest grossing films

The top 10 highest-grossing films worldwide 2003.

List of released films

References

External links
 Bollywood films of 2003 at the Internet Movie Database

2003
Lists of 2003 films by country or language
2003 in Indian cinema